Lark Suite is an enterprise collaboration platform developed by ByteDance and first released to the public in 2019. 

Lark and its China-only equivalent Feishu ("flying message") operate independently of one another and store user data separately (Lark in Singapore, Feishu in Beijing).

History 
Lark was developed by Lark Technologies Pte. Ltd., a subsidiary of ByteDance based in Singapore, and was originally developed as an internal tool.

In November 2018, Lark became ByteDance's internal communication and collaboration platform. 

In April 2019, Lark became available in overseas markets. 

In March 2020, ByteDance prepared to release a "Google-like suite of office collaboration tools" (referencing Google Workspace) focusing on cloud-based file management and document and spreadsheet editing.

In April 2020, during the COVID-19 pandemic, Lark made its service available for free across Southeast Asia.

References

External links 

ByteDance
Collaborative software